The Sinclair TV80, also known as the Flat Screen Pocket TV or FTV1, was a pocket television released by Sinclair Research in September 1983. Unlike Sinclair's earlier attempts at a portable television, the TV80 used a flat CRT with a side-mounted electron gun instead of a conventional CRT; the picture was made to appear larger than it was by the use of a Fresnel lens. It was a commercial failure, and did not recoup the £4m it cost to develop; only 15,000 units were sold. New Scientist warned that the technology used by the device would be short-lived, in view of the liquid crystal display technology being developed by Casio.

References

External links 
 

Television technology
Sinclair Research
Products introduced in 1984